Franz Karl Eduard von Gebhardt (13 June 1838 – 3 February 1925) was a Baltic German painter of portraits and historical scenes, and a professor at the Kunstakademie Düsseldorf.

Biography 
He was born to Ferdinand Theodor von Gebhardt (1803–1869), Provost and member of the Consistorial Council in Reval, and his wife, Wilhelmine, née Von Glehn (1808–1880). He graduated from the local gymnasium at sixteen, and enrolled at the Imperial Academy of Arts in Saint Petersburg, where he studied for three years.

He then spent two years travelling, spending some time in Karlsruhe, where he took classes at the Academy of Fine Arts. He arrived in Düsseldorf in 1860, and became a student of Wilhelm Sohn, who gave him such wholehearted encouragement that he decided to stay there. He settled on a street which was the home of several other artists and their studios.

In 1872, he married a local woman, Klara Jungnick (1851–1897). The following year, he was named a professor at the Kunstakademie. His best-known students included Otto Boyer and Carl Schmitz-Pleis. 

At the Große Berliner Kunstausstellung of 1918,  he was awarded a gold medal. Not long before his death he became an Ehrenbürger (Honorary Citizen) of Düsseldorf.

Streets were named after him in Essen and Wuppertal.

Work
Due to his father's profession, he was inclined to religious themes from the beginning. His models were the Dutch and German masters of the 15th and 16th centuries, and he strove for a realistic presentation. It was said that what he gained in truthfulness was a loss for beauty.

Some of his best-known Biblical scenes are:
 "Christ on the Cross" (1866, St Mary's Cathedral, Tallinn)
 "The Last Supper" (1870, National Gallery, Berlin)
 "Crucifixion" (1873, Hamburg Kunsthalle)
 "Ascension of Christ" (1881, National Gallery, Berlin)
 "Taking Care of Christ's Body" (1883, Dresden Gallery)
 "Jacob and the Angel" (1893, Dresden Gallery)
 "Christ and the Rich Youth" (1892, Düsseldorf Gallery)
 "Sermon on the Mount" (1893, Düsseldorf Gallery)
 "Healing of the Palsied" (1895, Breslau Museum)
 "The Raising of Lazarus" (1896, Museum Kunstpalast)

He also painted excellent portraits; making sketches of prototypical peasants,  which he drew while visiting Estonia. There, he was a tutor to famous Estonian painters such as Ants Laikmaa, and the brothers, Kristjan and Paul Raud. Many of works were considered for inclusion in the series of trading cards issued by the Stollwerck chocolate company.

Other selected works

References

Further reading 
 Dietrich Bieber, Ekkehard Mai: "Gebhardt und Janssen – Religiöse und Monumentalmalerei im späten 19. Jahrhundert", In: Wend von Kalnein: Die Düsseldorfer Malerschule. Verlag Philipp von Zabern, Mainz 1979, pg.165 ff.
 Erik Thomson and Günter Krüger: Eduard von Gebhardt – Leben und Werk, Verlag Nordostdeutsches Kulturwerk, Lüneburg 1991 
 Rudolf Burckhardt: Die Wandgemälde Eduard von Gebhardts in der Friedenskirche zu Düsseldorf : 12 Blätter mit begleitenden Worten, Pestalozzihaus, Düsseldorf 1908 (Online)

External links 

 
 Baltische Historische Kommission: Entry on Gebhardt, Karl Franz Eduard*. In: BBLD – Baltisches biografisches Lexikon digital
 Gebhardt, Eduard von; in the  Ostdeutsche Biografie
 More works by Gebhardt @ ArtNet
 Heinrich J. Schmidt: "Eduard von Gebhard" in: Neue Deutsche Biographie (1964), pp.119–120 (Online)

1838 births
1925 deaths
People from Järva Parish
People from the Governorate of Estonia
Baltic-German people
19th-century German painters
German male painters
20th-century German painters
20th-century German male artists
19th-century Estonian painters
19th-century Estonian male artists
Emigrants from the Russian Empire to Germany
19th-century German male artists